Duomo is an Italian term for a church with the features of, or having been built to serve as, a cathedral, whether or not it currently plays this role. Monza Cathedral, for example, has never been a diocesan seat and is by definition not a cathedral.  On the other hand, the city of Trevi no longer has a bishop, although it once did, and the erstwhile cathedral of Emilianus of Trevi is now a mere church. By contradistinction, the Italian word for a cathedral sensu stricto is cattedrale. There is no direct translation of "duomo" into English, leading to many such churches being erroneously called "cathedral" in English, regardless of whether the church in question hosts a bishop.

Many people refer to particular churches simply as il Duomo, the Duomo, without regard to the full proper name of the church.

Similar words exist in other European languages: Dom (German), dom (Romanian), dóm (Hungarian and Slovak), dôme (French), domo (Portuguese), doms (Latvian), tum (Polish), domkirke (Danish and Norwegian), dómkirkja (Icelandic), domkyrka (Swedish), toomkirik (Estonian), tuomiokirkko (Finnish) and so on. Also in these languages the respective terms do not necessarily refer to a church functioning as a cathedral, but also to proto-cathedrals or simply prominent church buildings, which have never been a cathedral in the exact sense of that word. German Dom and Polish tum became the synecdoche used – pars pro toto – for most existing or former collegiate churches. Therefore, the uniform translation of these terms into English as "cathedrals" may not always be appropriate and should be used on a contextual basis.

According to the Oxford English Dictionary and the Zingarelli, the word duomo derives from the Latin word domus, meaning "house", as a cathedral is the "house of God", or domus Dei. The Garzanti online dictionary also gives the etymology as deriving from "house", but "house of the bishop" instead.

Italian cathedrals are often highly decorated and contain notable artworks; in many cases the buildings themselves are true artworks. Perhaps the best known duomo is the one in Florence, but other well-known cathedrals include the Milan Cathedral, Archbasilica of St. John Lateran and those of Siena, Alba, Ancona, Mantua and Parma.

See also
 List of building types

References

Types of church buildings